Brett Sargon (born 3 December 1991 in Auckland, New Zealand) is a New Zealand curler.

At the national level, he is a three-time New Zealand men's champion curler (2014, 2016, 2020) and two-time New Zealand mixed champion curler (2016, 2017).

Teams

Men's

Mixed

Mixed doubles

References

External links

 Video:
 
 

Living people
1991 births
Sportspeople from Auckland
New Zealand male curlers
New Zealand curling champions
21st-century New Zealand people